Martial Aubertin (18 October 1775 - 15 November 1824), was a French stage actor and dramatist.

An actor of the Théâtre de la Porte Saint-Martin, Aubertin was generally felt by its qualities and good behavior. Besides his theater plays, he produced songs and some Latin verse parts.

Theatre 
 La Dupe de la ruse, with Henrion, comédie-vaudeville, Paris, 1808, in-8° ;
 Les Deux Veuves ou les Contrastes, comedy in 1 act, with Armand-François Jouslin de La Salle, 10 April 1821 ;
 Zoé ou l’effet au porteur, in 1 act, with Théophile Dumersan, 1821, in-8° ;
 Les Suites d’un bienfait, with Ménessier and Martin, 1821, in-8°, etc.

 

19th-century French male actors
French male stage actors
19th-century French dramatists and playwrights
Male actors from Paris
1775 births
1824 deaths